B'nai B'rith Camp may refer to:
B'nai B'rith Beber Camp
B'nai B'rith Perlman Camp
B’nai B’rith Camp (Oregon) 
Camp B'nai B'rith of Ottawa